The Sapphire  Stakes is an Australian Turf Club Group 2 Thoroughbred horse race for fillies and mares three years old and older, at set weights with penalties, over a distance of 1200 metres, held annually at Randwick Racecourse, Sydney, Australia in the autumn during the ATC Championships series. Total prize money for the race is A$300,000.

History

Grade

1998–2001 -  Listed Race
2002–2006 -  Group 3
2007 onwards - Group 2

Name
In 2010 the race was named as the Lady Sonia McMahon Memorial Stakes in honour of Lady Sonia McMahon, wife of Sir William McMahon, former Prime Minister of Australia who died in April of that year.

Winners

2022 - Bella Nipotina
2021 - Fasika
2020 - White Moss
2019 - White Moss
2018 - Quilista
2017 - Secret Agenda
2016 - Two Blue
2015 - Avoid Lightning
 2014 - Cosmic Endeavour
 2013 - Arinosa
 2012 - Atlantic Jewel
 2011 - Hurtle Myrtle
 2010 - Renaissance
 2009 - Court
 2008 - Belong to Many
 2007 - Fire Song
 2006 - Coolroom Candidate
 2005 - Glamour Puss
 2004 - Recurring
 2003 - Fatoon
 2002 - Fair Embrace
 2001 - Spinning Hill 
 2000 - Spinning Hill 
 1999 - †Snippet's Lass
 1998 - What Can I Say 

†In 1999 Little Pattie was first past the post, but later disqualified for returning a positive swab.

See also
 List of Australian Group races
 Group races

External links 
Sapphire Stakes (ATC)

References

Horse races in Australia
Randwick Racecourse